Filmbyen (English: Film City) is a film studio complex located in Hvidovre just outside Copenhagen, Denmark.

Filmbyen is a former military base. It houses many film-related companies. Many films and TV-series have been shot there.

It was founded by Lars von Trier and Peter Aalbæk Jensen's company Zentropa in 1997 and is still owned and run by Zentropa.

The story of Filmbyen, its people and companies is told in Thomas Vilhelm's book Filmbyen (Ekstra Bladets Forlag, 2007), and in the documentary Filmbyen, la nouvelle Mecque du cinéma? (Filmbyen, the new Mecca of cinema?) directed by Pablo Tréhin-Marçot (France, 2007).

See also
 Think Tank on European Film and Film Policy

References

External links
Filmbyen official site
Zentropa official site
Interview with Peter Aalbæk Jensen

Film production companies of Denmark
Danish film studios
Mass media in Copenhagen